Carlos Echeverria (January 13, 1930 – July 7, 2015) was an American sailor. He competed in the Dragon event at the 1956 Summer Olympics.

References

External links
 

1930 births
2015 deaths
American male sailors (sport)
Olympic sailors of the United States
Sailors at the 1956 Summer Olympics – Dragon
Sportspeople from Camden, New Jersey
Tufts Jumbos sailors